Boulder Valley Grange No. 131, also known as Boulder Valley Community Hall, is an historic wooden Grange hall located at 3400 North 95th Street  in Lafayette, Colorado. It was built in 1900 and features a hipped roof with clapboard sides. Various additions have been made which maintain its architectural integrity.

On December 7, 1987, it was added to the National Register of Historic Places.

Today it serves as the meeting place of Pleasant View Grange No. 164.

References

Clubhouses on the National Register of Historic Places in Colorado
Cultural infrastructure completed in 1900
Buildings and structures in Boulder County, Colorado
Grange organizations and buildings in Colorado
Grange buildings on the National Register of Historic Places
National Register of Historic Places in Boulder County, Colorado
Lafayette, Colorado